Flos anniella or darkie plushblue, is a species of butterfly belonging to the lycaenid family described by William Chapman Hewitson in 1862. It is found in  the Indomalayan realm.

Subspecies
Flos anniella anniella (Singapore, Peninsular Malaya, southern Thailand, Sumatra, Borneo)
Flos anniella artegal Doherty, 1889 (central Burma to northern Thailand, Mergui)
Flos anniella malangana (Toxopeus, 1929) (Java)

References

External links
Flos at Markku Savela's Lepidoptera and Some Other Life Forms

Flos
Butterflies described in 1862